Pezoula is a settlement in the Xanthi regional unit of Greece. It is part of the community, municipal unit and municipality of Abdera. It is located approximately four kilometers from Abdera. In 1991, the settlement contained 151 inhabitants.

External links

Populated places in Xanthi (regional unit)